"Cold Cold Heart" is a song by Wet Wet Wet, recorded as a new track for their first greatest hits album, End of Part One. It was released as a single on 27 December 1993 and reached number 20 on the UK Singles Chart.

The song features background vocals by an uncredited French-speaking female. She is featured in the song's video.

Track listings
CD 1:
"Cold Cold Heart"
"Roll 'Um Easy"
"Cold Cold Heart" (Youth mix)
"Cold Cold Heart" (Arthur Baker remix)

CD 2:
"Cold Cold Heart"
"Another Love in Me"
"Wishing I Was Lucky" (Arthur Baker remix 93-12")
"Cold Cold Heart" (Arthur Baker remix 93-7")

MC:
"Cold Cold Heart"
"Roll 'Um Easy"
"Cold Cold Heart" (Arthur Baker remix 93)

7":
"Cold Cold Heart"
"Roll 'Um Easy"
"Cold Cold Heart" (Arthur Baker remix 93)

References

1993 singles
1993 songs
Wet Wet Wet songs
PolyGram singles
Songs written by Marti Pellow
Songs written by Tommy Cunningham
Songs written by Graeme Clark (musician)
Songs written by Neil Mitchell (musician)